Since the inception of La Liga in 1929, Spain's highest level of association football annual league tournament, 88 football stadiums have been used to host matches. The inaugural round of La Liga matches took place on 10 February 1929 with five clubs hosting the opening fixtures.

El Alcoraz was the latest stadium to host its first La Liga match, and the Wanda Metropolitano is the arena that was built most recently.

Stadiums
Stadiums listed in bold indicate that they are the home grounds of teams participating in the 2020–21 La Liga season, while those stadiums listed in italics have now been demolished.

† For closed or demolished grounds, capacity is taken at closure.
‡ Currently in the process of, or scheduled to be developed.

See also
List of stadiums in Spain

References

External links
La Liga official website

Stadiums